The Cuban Order of Naval Merit (First Class) was a medal of special merit. The Cuban Order of Naval Merit was a state order of chivalry or merit. Its medals, awarded by the Cuban government from the 1920s through the 1950s, were made by the Cuban firm Dator Plus Altra and were made of sterling silver and enamel.

Notable U.S. Recipients
Hayne D. Boyden, Brigadier general (USMC)
William Halsey, Jr., Fleet Admiral (United States) 
Thomas Holcomb, General & Commandant (USMC)
James L. Kauffman, Vice Admiral (USN)
Ernest King, Fleet Admiral (USN)
Richard R. McNulty, Rear Admiral (USN)
Pedro del Valle Lieutenant General (USMC)

See also
 Orders, decorations, and medals of Cuba

References

Naval Merit
1920s establishments in Cuba
1950s disestablishments in Cuba